Indira Gandhi Government Medical College & Hospital (IGGMCH) (also known as Mayo Hospital) established in 1968 is located in Central Nagpur. run by the Government of Maharashtra. It is one of the Three Government Medical Colleges in Nagpur city. The other Government Medical College in Nagpur city is Government Medical College (Nagpur), and All India Institute of Medical Sciences, Nagpur

History 

Indira Gandhi Medical College & Hospital Nagpur was originally known as "Mayo Hospital" was established in the year 1905. In 1914 to further the cause of Medical Education the " Robertson Medical School" was opened. In 1967 "Corporation Medical College" was established, which was transferred to the Government in 1968 and was renamed as Indira Gandhi Medical College. Now it has an identity as "Indira Gandhi Government Medical College & Hospital"

Academics 

Indira Gandhi Government Medical College & Hospital has Medical Council of India recognition for 200 MBBS admissions for the year 2019-2020.Postgraduate courses are available in the subjects, Anatomy, Physiology, Biochemistry, Pharmacology, Pathology, Microbiology, Forensic Medicine, Community Medicine, Ophthalmology, ENT, Orthopedics, Anesthesiology, Paediatrics, General Medicine, General Surgery, Obstetrics & Gynaecology, Radio Diagnosis, Respiratory Medicine, Orthopaedics.

References

External links 
 Official website
 Medical Council of India 

Universities and colleges in Nagpur
Medical colleges in Maharashtra
Educational institutions established in 1968
1947 establishments in India
Affiliates of Maharashtra University of Health Sciences